"Head Held High" is a song by Dublin-based alternative rock quartet Kodaline. The song was released on 24 August 2018 as the fifth single from the band's third studio album, Politics of Living (2018). The song peaked at number sixty-eight on the Irish Singles Chart.

Music video
A music video to accompany the release of "Head Held High" was first released onto YouTube on 24 August 2018.

Charts

Release history

Other
Also Head Held High known as a graphic novel about time traveler and parallel universe jumper by Airat Asadullin, published on Acomics and NECjAR.

References

2018 singles
2018 songs
Kodaline songs
Songs written by Jonny Coffer
Songs written by Johnny McDaid